The 2023 season is Sabah's eighth competitive season in the highest tier of Malaysian football since the foundation of Malaysia Super League in 2004, and the club's fourth consecutive in the Malaysia Super League.

Squad

Transfers

Players in
Pre-season

Players out
Pre-season

Loans in
Pre-season

Loans out
Pre-season

Friendly matches

Pre-Season Friendlies

Competitions

Overview

Malaysia Super League

League table

Results summary

Results by round

Fixtures and Results

FA Cup

Fixtures and Results

Statistics

Squad statistics

Disciplinary record

Goals

Clean sheets

References

Sabah F.C. (Malaysia) seasons
Sabah